Star Vijay Super (formerly Vijay Super) is an Indian Tamil-language subscription movie  channel, owned by The Walt Disney Company India. a wholly owned by The Walt Disney Company. Star Vijay Super offers movies in Kollywood, Hollywood, Bollywood, Tollywood and Mollywood. It was launched as an entertainment channel mainly broadcasting dubbed content and later repositioned as movie channel. It broadcasts movies continuously for Tamil audience. Vijay Super was launched by Star India on 25 August 2016.

History
Star Vijay Super initially launched as a male-oriented channel, also airing old series and shows of Star Vijay. It was rebranded on 10 March 2019 and started airing movies with a new logo and tagline Dhool Cinema Dhinam Dhinam and partners with parent company Disney to telecast Hollywood movies.

The High-Definition feed, Star Vijay Super HD launched on March 15, 2023.

References

External links
 Star Vijay official page

Tamil-language television channels
Television channels and stations established in 2016
Television stations in Chennai
Disney Star

Star Vijay Super